Legislative elections were held in Argentina on 4 March 1934. The National Democratic Party remained the largest faction, with 63 of the 158 seats. Voter turnout was 66%.

Results

Results by province

References

1934 elections in South America
1934 in Argentina
Elections in Argentina
Infamous Decade
March 1934 events